Communauté d'agglomération du Pays de Gex is the communauté d'agglomération, an intercommunal structure, centred on the town of Gex. It is located in the Ain department, in the Auvergne-Rhône-Alpes region, eastern France. Created in 1995, the administrative seat is located in its namesake commune of Gex. Its area is 404.9 km2. Its population was 98,257 in 2019, of which 13,121 lived in Gex proper.

Composition
The communauté d'agglomération consists of the following 27 communes:

Cessy
Challex
Chevry
Chézery-Forens
Collonges
Crozet
Divonne-les-Bains
Échenevex
Farges
Ferney-Voltaire
Gex
Grilly
Léaz
Lélex
Mijoux
Ornex
Péron
Pougny
Prévessin-Moëns
Saint-Genis-Pouilly
Saint-Jean-de-Gonville
Sauverny
Ségny
Sergy
Thoiry
Versonnex
Vesancy

References

Gex
Gex